Daniel High Barnhart (June 27, 1912 – June 16, 1965) was an American football tailback who played in the National Football League. He played for one season for the Philadelphia Eagles in 1934. He played college football at Centenary and St. Mary's.

Professional career
Barnhart played in one game for the Philadelphia Eagles in 1934, throwing a four-yard touchdown pass to offensive tackle Bob Gonya.

References

1912 births
1965 deaths
Centenary Gentlemen football players
Philadelphia Eagles players
Saint Mary's Gaels football players
People from Chickasha, Oklahoma
Players of American football from Oklahoma